Gerald Shur (October 18, 1933 – August 25, 2020) was an American lawyer, and the founder of the United States Federal Witness Protection Program.

Gerald Shur was born on October 18, 1933, in the Bronx, New York, the son of Rose (Nissell) Shur, a homemaker, and, Abraham, general manager of the United Popular Dress Manufacturers Association, an employer group, and later owner of a dress-manufacturing shop.

Shur was educated at DeWitt Clinton High School in the Bronx, and earned a bachelor's degree in business administration at the University of Texas at Austin in 1955, followed by a law degree there in 1957.

Shur died aged 86 on August 25, 2020 at his home in Warminster, Pennsylvania, from lung cancer.

References

1933 births
2020 deaths
People from Warminster, Pennsylvania
University of Texas at Austin alumni
DeWitt Clinton High School alumni
People from the Bronx
20th-century American lawyers
United States Department of Justice officials
Deaths from lung cancer in Pennsylvania